Alessandro Tulli (born 8 April 1982) is an Italian footballer.

Tulli started his career at A.S. Roma's youth system. He was loaned to various Serie B clubs before U.S. Lecce signed him in join-ownership bid on 31 August 2006, for €250,000.

On 31 January 2008, Piacenza bought another half from A.S. Roma for a reported €650,000 (via Lecce, which Lecce paid €350,000 to Roma) and Tulli started to play for Piacenza along with Zlatko Dedič, Matteo Serafini to replace Daniele Cacia. However, he lost his starting place since 2008–09 Serie B season, in which he also suffered an out-of-season injury in summer 2008.

In June 2010, Lecce gave up the remaining 50% registration rights for free. In January 2011, Piacenza released Tulli. Tulli was without a club for one year to sign for his next club Latina.

Tulli became free agent again in summer 2013.

References

External links
http://www.gazzetta.it/speciali/serie_b/2008_nw/giocatori/54584.shtml

1982 births
Living people
Italian footballers
Italy youth international footballers
A.S. Roma players
L.R. Vicenza players
U.S. Livorno 1915 players
U.S. Salernitana 1919 players
U.S. Triestina Calcio 1918 players
U.S. Lecce players
Piacenza Calcio 1919 players
Latina Calcio 1932 players
Serie B players
Serie C players
Association football forwards
Footballers from Rome